Jean Claude Michel Bonin-Pissarro (11 July 1921 – 21 July 2021) was a French painter and graphic designer. He was the son of Jeanne Pissarro (1881–1948) and the grandson of painter Camille Pissarro (1830–1903). He was also the father of French painter Frédéric Bonin-Pissarro.

Bonin-Pissarro died in July 2021, at the age of 100.

References

External links

Claude Bonin-Pissarro s'expose aux yeux du public (video)

1921 births
2021 deaths
20th-century French painters
20th-century French male artists
French male painters
21st-century French painters
21st-century French male artists
Modern painters
French graphic designers
French people of Portuguese-Jewish descent
French centenarians
Men centenarians
Pissarro family